Rhynchospora (beak-rush or beak-sedge) is a genus of about 400 species of sedges with a cosmopolitan distribution. The genus includes both annual and perennial species, mostly with erect 3-sided stems and 3-ranked leaves.  The achenes bear a beak-like tubercule (hence the name “beak-rush”, although the plants are sedges, not rushes) and are sometimes subtended by bristles.  Many of the species are similar in vegetative appearance, and mature fruits are needed to make a positive identification.

The inflorescences (spikelets) are sometimes subtended by bracts which can be leaf-like or showy.

Ecology
Rhynchospora occurs on all continents except Antarctica, but is most diverse in the neotropics.  It is most frequent in sunny habitats with wet, acidic soils. In marshes and savannas, Rhynchospora may be the dominant form of vegetation.

Taxonomy

Contemporary taxonomic treatments include Rhynchospora and the related genus Pleurostachys in the tribe Rhynchosporae, a well-supported clade within Cyperaceae.  The most comprehensive monograph of the genus  divides Rhynchospora into two subgenera and 29 sections. A recent molecular analysis  identifies two primary clades within the genus, with well-supported subgroups that agree with several of the sections identified by Kükenthal. However, this molecular analysis also suggests that Pleurostachys is embedded within one of the primary clades of Rhynchospora and that several of the recognized sections are not monophyletic.

Selected species
Rhynchospora alba - White beak-sedge. Europe, North America
Rhynchospora caduca - Southeast North America
Rhynchospora californica - California beaked-rush, occurring in Marin and Sonoma County, California
Rhynchospora capillacea - Slender beakrush. Eastern North America
Rhynchospora capitellata - Brownish beak-sedge
Rhynchospora colorata - White star sedge. Southeast North America.
Rhynchospora fusca - Brown beak-sedge. Europe.
Rhynchospora glomerata - Clustered beak-sedge. North America.
Rhynchospora inexpansa - Southeastern North America and West Indies
Rhynchospora knieskernii - Knieskern's beak-sedge.
Rhynchospora longisetis
Rhynchospora macrostachya - Tall horned beaksedge. Eastern North America.
Rhynchospora megalocarpa - Southeastern United States
Rhynchospora megaplumosa  - Florida
Rhynchospora nervosa - Tropical New World.
Rhynchospora rariflora - Southeastern North America, West Indies, Central America
Rhynchospora scirpoides - North America
Rhynchospora waspamensis - New World.

References

External links
 Rhynchospora interactive identification key

Other sources
 Acevedo-Rodríguez, P. & Strong, M.T. (2005). Monocotyledons and Gymnosperms of Puerto Rico and the Virgin Islands. Contributions from the United States National Herbarium 52: 1-415.
 Gale, S. 1944. Rhynchospora sect. Eurhynchospora in Canada, the United States and the West Indies. Rhodora 46: 80–134, 159–197, 255–278.
 Kral, R. 1996. Supplemental notes on Rhynchospora crinipes and related species in sect. Fuscae (Cyperaceae). Sida 17: 385–411.
 Strong, M.T. (2006). Taxonomy and distribution of Rhynchospora (Cyperaceae) in the Guianas, South America. Contributions from the United States National Herbarium 53: 1-225.
 Thomas, W. W. 1994. 1. Rhynchospora Vahl. 6: 404–422. In G. Davidse, M. Sousa Sánchez & A.O. Chater (eds.) Flora Mesoamericana. Universidad Nacional Autónoma de México, México, D. F.

 
Cyperaceae genera
Taxa named by Martin Vahl